The Victoria Memorial Metro Station is located on the Red Line of the Hyderabad Metro. It is part of Corridor I of Hyderabad metro starting from Miyapur and was opened to public on 24 September 2018.

Etymology 
This metro station is named after Victoria Memorial Home (Saroornagar-e-Mahal), constructed in 1901 by Nizam, Mahbub Ali Khan, Asaf Jah VI. It is located near Sri Khilla Maisamma Temple.

History 
It was opened to public on 24 September 2018.

Facilities

References

Hyderabad Metro stations
2018 establishments in Telangana